Shyheim Dionel Franklin (born November 14, 1979) is an American rapper from New York better known simply as Shyheim. He initially gained fame as a teenager, releasing his debut album AKA the Rugged Child at the age of 14 in 1994. He has spent the majority of his career affiliated with the Wu-Tang Clan, frequently collaborating with Method Man and Ghostface Killah.

As a teenager, Shyheim was considered one of hip hop's brightest prospects, being referred to as a "Wunderkind" and a "prodigy", even being admired by fellow rappers such as Jay-Z, who said he "looked up to him" in admiration in his autobiography Decoded. 

After 1996's The Lost Generation, Shyheim's career saw a string of underperforming releases over the next eighteen years, and was finally derailed due to a hit-and-run conviction. He was released from prison in early 2020.

Career

Music
Shyheim's Virgin Records debut, AKA the Rugged Child. It included the hit single "On and On" the video of which featured Method Man, and the album rose to #7 on the US Billboard R&B chart.

Shyheim joined others, notably the Fugees, to provide a free concert to deaf children in a summer camp in 1996.

Shyheim released another album in 1996, The Lost Generation, which featured members of G.P. Wu and Brooklyn Zu. He also shared the stage with the Notorious B.I.G., Tupac Shakur, and Big Daddy Kane at Madison Square Garden, for a live freestyle session. He also made an appearance on Big Daddy Kane's "Show & Prove," which featured Ol' Dirty Bastard, Sauce Money, Scoob and Jay-Z.

Shyheim resumed his career after almost a decade and released subsequent albums on the label he founded, Bottom Up Records. His third and fourth albums, The Greatest Story Never Told and Enter the Bottom, were released to little fanfare in 2004 and 2008. Shyheim released his fifth solo album, Disrespectfully Speaking, October 2009 on his label Bottom Up Records.

Acting
Shyheim starred in the video for TLC's "Waterfalls".

He has had roles in films such as the 1996 Pam Grier, Fred Williamson, Jim Brown, and Richard Roundtree vehicle Original Gangstas, In Too Deep, and The Preacher's Wife and he also starred in the television show The Parent Hood. Shyheim appeared in a small role in the prequel Carlito's Way: Rise to Power.

Legal problems
In July 2002, Shyheim was sentenced to a year in prison after second degree attempted robbery. On November 4, 2003, Shyheim was released from prison. 

In January 2014, Shyheim turned himself into authorities facing charges for leaving the scene of an accident during a hit-and-run accident that left one person dead. On August 21, 2014, Shyheim was sentenced to 14 years in prison after he pled guilty to second degree manslaughter. He also received a concurrent term of seven years for a gun conviction, and is subject to five years' post release supervision. On January 6, 2020, Shyheim was released from prison after serving a five year sentence.

Discography

Studio albums

AKA the Rugged Child (1994) #52 Billboard 200; #7 R&B/Hip Hop
The Lost Generation (1996) #63 Billboard 200; #10 R&B/ Hip Hop
Manchild (1999)
The Greatest Story Never Told (2004)
Disrespectfully Speaking (2009)

Filmography
 1996 Original Gangstas as 'Dink'
 1996 The Preacher's Wife as Teen
 1999 In Too Deep as 'Che'
 2005 Carlito's Way: Rise to Power as Unknown

See also 
List of Wu-Tang Clan affiliates

References

External links
 Shyheims Official Website
 
 

Living people
African-American male rappers
Rappers from Brooklyn
Male actors from New York City
Virgin Records artists
Wu-Tang Clan affiliates
Gangsta rappers
1977 births
21st-century American rappers